Goodyera repens, an orchid in the genus Goodyera, is called by the common name creeping lady's-tresses in Anglophone Europe and dwarf rattlesnake plantain or lesser rattlesnake plantain in North America.

It is a green underground creeper that sends out occasional skinny stems above the surface.  During the summer, these stems bear flowers arranged in a spiral.  These flowers twist themselves to face toward the sun.

Goodyera repens is found in isolated spots in the forests and bogs of Europe. It is a rare plant, but it is the most common orchid in Scandinavia. The species  is widespread across much of Europe, Asia and North America including Russia, China, Germany, Poland, the United Kingdom, Canada and the United States, though never very common in any of these places.

Goodyera repens is a protected species throughout most of its range.  It does not survive fire, and does not soon reenter an area after fire or logging.  It is generally found only in forests at least 95 years old.

Like other orchids, Goodyera repens lives in symbiosis with mycorrhiza, rhizome-dwelling fungus (Ceratobasidium cornigerum or Rhizoctonia goodyearae-repentis). The mycorrhiza help the orchid absorb and assimilate nutrients.

This orchid is pollinated by bumblebees, allowing for its sexual reproduction.  It can also reproduce vegetatively.

References

External links

 National Biodiversity Network (UK) Grid map
 Creeping ladies tresses species profile 

repens
Orchids of Europe
Orchids of Asia
Orchids of North America
Plants described in 1753
Taxa named by Carl Linnaeus